The Sender Feldberg/Black Forest (transmitter Black Forest) is a transmission facility for FM and TV in Feldberg, Black Forest, Germany.

The transmitter has an old and a new transmission tower. It is a  concrete tower with an observation deck at a height of 36 metres and a diameter of 9.1 metres. The tower is now closed due to obsolescence. 

In 2003, a new  transmission tower was erected.

References

External links
 http://www.skyscraperpage.com/diagrams/?b46129
 http://www.skyscraperpage.com/diagrams/?b46130

See also
List of towers

Radio masts and towers in Germany
Observation towers
Buildings and structures in Breisgau-Hochschwarzwald
Towers completed in 2003